Narawara (1650–1673) was king of Toungoo dynasty of Burma (Myanmar), who ruled for about 11 months between 1672 and 1673. Narawara ascended to the Burmese throne after his father Pye died in 1672. But Narawara died young and was succeeded by his brother Minyekyawdin.

Early life
Narawara was the only son and middle child of the three children of King Pye and his chief queen Khin Ma Latt. He was born in 1650. He became the heir apparent on 1 June 1664 (Sunday, 8th waxing of Nayon 1026 ME).

Notes

References

Bibliography
 
 
 
 

Rulers of Toungoo
1673 deaths
1650 births
17th-century Burmese monarchs